Mina Guli is an Australian businesswoman, active in the environmental sector. She is CEO of Thirst.

Early life and education
Guli was born in Mount Waverley, a suburb of Melbourne and attended The University of Melbourne.. In 1993 Guli was elected as president of the Monash University Student Union.
At the age of twenty-two Guli broke her back in a swimming pool accident and was told by her doctors that she would never run again.

Career 
After graduation, Guli worked as a lawyer in the private sector in the energy and infrastructure sectors. In 1999 she moved to the Sydney Futures Exchange, where she was involved in the development of Australia's carbon emission markets. In 2002 she was asked to join the World Bank and assisted in developing carbon trading projects in China, India, Nepal and Indonesia. She returned to the private sector in 2005 and continued her work in the renewable energy and climate change sectors in China.

In 2012 Guli founded Thirst, a group promoting water conservation to young people. Guli attempted to run one hundred marathons in one hundred days, to raise awareness of water scarcity, but a fractured femur forced her to abandon the attempt on day sixty three.

Guli is the former deputy chairman of the Australian Chamber of Commerce in Beijing, a strategic advisor to the Joint US-China Collaboration on Clean Energy, a member of the World Economic Forum’s Global Agenda Council on Sustainable Consumption, a member of the World Economic Forum’s Young Global Leaders community, and a member of the Young Presidents Organisation.

Awards 
In 2010 she was recognised as a Young Global Leader by the World Economic Forum, and in 2011 named as one of Australia’s “50 for the future”.

References 

1970 births
Australian women in business
Date of birth missing (living people)
Place of birth missing (living people)
Living people
Monash University alumni
University of Melbourne alumni
People from Mount Waverley, Victoria
People educated at the Presbyterian Ladies' College, Melbourne
Australian women lawyers
21st-century Australian businesspeople
Australian women environmentalists
Activists from Melbourne
Australian women chief executives